Taekwondo, for the 2013 Pacific Mini Games, took place at Kafika Hall, in Mata-Utu. The events, for this sport, took place on the 9 and 10 September 2013.

Medal table
Key:

Medal summary
There were fifteen medal events contested, nine for men and sixteen for women.

Men's events

Women's events

References

2013 Pacific Mini Games
2013 Pacific Mini Games
Pacific Mini Games